Josiah Bunting III  (born November 8, 1939) is an American educator. He has been a military officer, college president, and an author and speaker on education and Western culture. Bunting is married and has four adult children. His half-brother is Dick Ebersol, the creator and former executive producer of Saturday Night Live; Ebersol and Bunting have the same mother.

Background

Josiah Bunting was born in Haverford, Pennsylvania. He attended The Hill School in Pottstown, Pennsylvania,  and the Salisbury School in Connecticut, but was expelled from both institutions for playing pranks. He then entered the U.S. Marine Corps. Bunting went on to Virginia Military Institute where he graduated third in his class as an English major, and was elected to a Rhodes scholarship to attend the University of Oxford, where he received an M.A. and also served as president of the American Students Association. He entered the United States Army in 1966. After six years of service, he reached the rank of Major. He was stationed at Fort Bragg, North Carolina; Vietnam; and West Point, where he was assistant professor of history and social sciences.

Bunting's 1972 novel The Lionheads was a scathing account based on his experiences as an officer of the 9th Infantry Division in Vietnam in 1968. The novel's main antagonist, General Lemming, was based heavily on the commanding general, Julian Ewell.

The July 28, 1972 issue of LIFE magazine included a profile written by Thomas Moore of then Major Bunting examining his decision to leave West Point because of his desire to "disassociate [himself] from the active implementation of [the Army's] policy in Vietnam..." In the article Bunting also stated that he favored a "citizen draft and civilian control over the military" and that he didn't "want to see that son of a bitch who grows up in Greenwich, Conn., goes off to Yale and becomes a member of the Skull and Bones get out of doing some sort of national service." Bunting served on the faculty of the Naval War College for a year in 1973–74.

Bunting served as president of Briarcliff College, and later as president of Hampden–Sydney College from 1977 to 1987. He was also the headmaster of The Lawrenceville School near Princeton, New Jersey from 1987 to 1995. Notably, Lawrenceville is the archrival of Bunting's former high school, The Hill School. 
At Hampden–Sydney he revitalized the English composition or Rhetoric Program, enhanced the Western Civilization program, then called Western Man, making it more interdisciplinary. He also spearheaded the Campaign for Hampden-Sydney, a capital campaign that nearly tripled the college's endowment.

Bunting was appointed Superintendent of the Virginia Military Institute in 1995 and served until 2003. At VMI, he served as Professor of Humanities. He was responsible for overseeing preparations for and the enrollment of VMI's first female cadets. He was openly opposed to allowing women to attend VMI, calling the 1997 decision in United States v. Virginia which struck down VMI's male-only admittance policy a "savage disappointment."

Bunting is also a member of the UNESCO Commission and of the National Council of the National Endowment for the Humanities in Washington.

In 2004, Bunting was appointed chairman of the National Civic Literacy Board of the Intercollegiate Studies Institute.

In 2007, Bunting was appointed president of ISI's Lehrman American Studies Center.

In 2015, Bunting was appointed Chairman of the Friends Of the National World War II Memorial.

Books

Nonfiction
Small Units in the Control of Civil Disorder (1967)
Ulysses S. Grant (Times Books/Henry Holt, 2004), part of the American Presidents series (ed. Arthur M. Schlesinger Jr.)

Novels
The Lionheads selected one of the Ten Best Novels of 1973 by Time magazine.
The Advent of Frederick Giles (1974).
An Education for Our Time (Regnery, 1998), a work describing a "dying billionaire's detailed vision of a new, ideal college", was a main selection of the Conservative Book Club in 1998.
All Loves Excelling (Bridge Works, 2001), set in a boarding school.

Edited editions
Macaulay, Thomas Babington. Lays of Ancient Rome (Gateway, 1997)
Newman, Cardinal John Henry. The Idea of a University (Gateway, 1999)

Military service record

Rank

Awards and decorations

 Combat Infantryman Badge
 Parachutist Badge
 Bronze Star Medal with two oak leaf clusters
 Army Commendation Medal
 Presidential Unit Citation
 National Defense Service Medal
 Armed Forces Expeditionary Medal
 Vietnam Service Medal
 Vietnam Armed Forces Honor Medal, Second-Class
 Vietnam Campaign Medal
 Ranger Tab:

 Ninth Infantry Division ("Old Reliables") shoulder sleeve insignia (SSI):

References

Biography from Center for the American Idea (dated 2008)
Biography from VMI (dated 2002)
Biography from H-SC (dated 1995)
National Civic Literacy Board

External links

1939 births
Living people
Virginia Military Institute alumni
People from Litchfield, Connecticut
United States Army officers
United States Army personnel of the Vietnam War
Naval War College faculty
American Rhodes Scholars
People from Haverford Township, Pennsylvania
Alumni of Christ Church, Oxford
The Hill School alumni
Military personnel from Pennsylvania